Assumption Catholic High School may refer to:

 Assumption Catholic Secondary School in Burlington, Ontario
 Assumption College School in Windsor, Ontario